Haló noviny (meaning Hello Newspaper in English) is a newspaper published in the Czech Republic. It has close relations with the Communist Party of Bohemia and Moravia. The title of the newspaper follows the older titles, which has been published since 1929.

History and profile
Haló noviny was founded in 1991. The paper had a radical left-wing stance. It is one of the few newspapers in the Czech Republic not to be foreign owned. The publisher of the paper is Futura company. Newspaper follows title, published as regional newspaper in Prague from 1929, associated with journalist Julius Fučík. Its tabloid style is derived from its 1970s Brno edition.

On April 28, 2022, the newspaper moved from a daily publishing scheme to a weekly scheme.

See also
 List of newspapers in the Czech Republic

References

External links
 Haló noviny 

1991 establishments in Czechoslovakia
Daily newspapers published in the Czech Republic
Czech-language newspapers
Communist newspapers
Publications established in 1991
Newspapers published in Prague
Communist Party of Bohemia and Moravia